Marcin Przemysław Lewandowski (born 13 June 1987) is a Polish professional soldier and former middle-distance runner who specialized in the 800 metres and 1500 metres.

Personal life
Lewandowski was born in Szczecin on 13 June 1987.

He is a professional soldier in the Polish Army.

He is a graduate of physical education at the University of Szczecin 
with a masters dissertation titled "Marcin Lewandowski's 800m distance yearly preparation programme".

Clubs
He started his career in 2002 as an unaffiliated athlete. In the beginning he was coached by his brother, and represented Błękitni Osowa Sień. Since 2005 he represented Ósemka Police, and since July 2010 Zawisza Bydgoszcz. He left Zawisza and joined Benfica in Portugal in 2019, and in 2021 he joined AZS UMCS Lublin.

Running career
Lewandowski is coached by his brother, Tomasz.

Youth career
Lewandowski finished fourth at the 2006 World Junior Championships, won the 2007 European U23 Championships, and won the silver medal at the 2009 European U23 Championships behind countryfellow Adam Kszczot.

Senior career
Lewandowski competed at the 2008 Olympic Games without reaching the final, but then finished sixth at the 2009 European Indoor Championships and eighth at the 2009 World Championships. His first medal of 2010 was a bronze, as he was third behind Yuriy Borzakovskiy and Michael Rimmer at the 2010 European Team Championships. Lewandowski won the 800 m at the 2010 European Athletics Championships and took the silver medal behind David Rudisha at the 2010 IAAF Continental Cup.

Lewandowski improved his indoor best to 1:46.17 minutes at the Sparkassen Cup in February 2011, coming third.

In 2017, he won the bronze medal in the men's 4 × 800 metres relay at the 2017 IAAF World Relays held in Nassau, Bahamas.

Competition record

References

External links

Polish profile 

1987 births
Living people
Sportspeople from Szczecin
Polish male middle-distance runners
Athletes (track and field) at the 2008 Summer Olympics
Athletes (track and field) at the 2012 Summer Olympics
Athletes (track and field) at the 2016 Summer Olympics
Olympic athletes of Poland
European Athletics Championships medalists
World Athletics Championships athletes for Poland
World Athletics Championships medalists
Zawisza Bydgoszcz athletes
S.L. Benfica athletes
Polish Athletics Championships winners
Competitors at the 2007 Summer Universiade
European Athletics Indoor Championships winners
Athletes (track and field) at the 2020 Summer Olympics
Polish Army personnel